Uptown Cuba Historic District is a national historic district located at Cuba, Crawford County, Missouri. The district encompasses 19 contributing buildings located in the central business district of Cuba. It developed between about 1880 and 1963, and includes representative examples of Italianate style architecture. Notable buildings include the former Cuba City Hall and Fire Department (1934), Bank of Cuba (c. 1896), Kinder's Big Store (c. 1885), and Hotel Grand (1897).

It was listed on the National Register of Historic Places in 2013.

References

Historic districts on the National Register of Historic Places in Missouri
Italianate architecture in Missouri
Buildings and structures in Crawford County, Missouri
National Register of Historic Places in Crawford County, Missouri